Wilston railway station is located on the Ferny Grove line in Queensland, Australia. It serves the Brisbane suburb of Wilston.

Services
Wilston station is served by all stops Ferny Grove line services from Ferny Grove to Roma Street, Park Road, Coopers Plains and Beenleigh.

Services by platform

References

External links

Wilston station Queensland Rail
Wilston station Queensland's Railways on the Internet
[ Windsor station] TransLink travel information

Railway stations in Brisbane